The Hochschule für Gestaltung (HfG) Offenbach am Main (English: Offenbach am Main College of Design) is a German art and design university located in Offenbach am Main, in the German state of Hesse. It was given university status in 1970, and founded in 1832.

About 
The school is divided into two departments. The degree course offers a choice of different topics: design, art, communication design, media arts, stage design and product design. Additionally, the college offers a one-year (two-semester), project-oriented postgraduate course.

History 
HfG Offenbach was founded in 1832 as an Artisan School for Better Training of New Artisans. It soon became an Arts and Crafts School where crafts, artistic and theoretical subjects were taught at the same time. In its enumeration.The cyclopædia of education from 1883 states that the Art-Industry school in Offenbach is notable among European institutions.

In 1970 the Offenbacher Werkkunstschule was transformed into an artistic-scientific university of Hesse. Analogous to its lawful educational obligation to "teach and develop artistic forms and contents" and to "educate the new artistic and artistic-scientific generation", the activity profile of the HfG today encompasses artistic and scientific lecture and research in the diverse fields of visual communication and product design under special consideration of electronic media and newest technologies.

Notable faculty 

 Juliane Rebentisch, Philosopher
 Rudolf Koch, Typographer
 Karlgeorg Hoefer, Typographer
 Fritz Kredel, Graphic Designer
 Hermann Zapf, Typographer
 Hugo Eberhardt, Architect
 Dominikus Böhm, Architect
 Max Cetto, Architect
 Adam Jankowski, Artist
 Verner Panton, Industrial Designer
 Klaus Hesse, Graphic Designer
 Burghart Schmidt, Philosopher
 Manfred Stumpf, Digital Artist
 Georg-Christof Bertsch, Designmanager
 Vincenzo Baviera, Sculptor

References

External links

 Official website

Universities and colleges in Hesse
Offenbach am Main
Educational institutions established in 1837
Art schools in Germany
Design schools in Germany